The Pacific Spaceport Complex – Alaska (PSCA), formerly known as the Kodiak Launch Complex (KLC), is a dual-use commercial and military spaceport for sub-orbital and orbital launch vehicles. The facility is owned and operated by the Alaska Aerospace Corporation, a public corporation of the State of Alaska, and is located on Kodiak Island in Alaska.

The spaceport opened in 1998 and has supported 31 (up to January 2023) launches, most of those for the U.S. government. The site was closed for two years following a launch failure that caused significant damage to parts of the spaceport. It reopened in August 2016.

History 
Following the incorporation of the Alaska Aerospace Development Corporation in 1991 by the Alaska state legislature, plans were begun for the spaceport, known during development as the Alaska Orbital Launch Complex. Construction on the site began in January 1998, and the first launch took place in August 1998 from temporary accommodations at the site.

After a launch failure in August 2014 damaged the launch tower, payload processing facility and integrated processing facility, Alaska Aerospace made plans to repair and upgrade the facilities to support larger rockets, but Governor Bill Walker stopped work in December 2014 as part of an order to address a state budget shortfall. Repairs to the facility were funded by state insurance at a cost of US$26–29 million. During efforts to repair the facilities, the spaceport was formally renamed to "Pacific Spaceport Complex – Alaska" in an announcement made on 14 April 2015. The facility was formally re-dedicated on 13 August 2016, to celebrate the completion of repairs.

In mid-2016, the Alaska Aerospace Corporation "signed a multi-year contract with the Missile Defense Agency (MDA) for multiple launches from the PSCA through 2021". The arrangement includes a sole-source contract for two flight tests of the Terminal High Altitude Area Defense (THAAD) system. Two private companies, Rocket Lab and Vector Space Systems, were considering using the spaceport for commercial launches as early as 2019. Another private company, Eclipse Orbital, was working with the Alaska Aerospace Corporation to prepare for flight operations of their "Corona" launch vehicle in 2020. As of 2022, not Rocket Lab, Vector Space System nor Eclipse Orbital has launched anything from Alaska.

Indian private space company Agnikul Cosmos signed a memorandum of agreement with Alaska Aerospace Corporation to test launch their Agnibaan rocket from the Pacific Spaceport Complex. The launch from Alaska was expected to take place from 2022 onwards. Under the agreement, Alaska Aerospace and AgniKul will work together to secure several regulatory approvals including US Federal Aviation Administration (FAA) launch licensing, US export control, and will comply with export laws & regulations in India to receive necessary clearances from the Indian authorities as well. The aim is to define launch vehicle-spaceport interfaces, related procedures and conduct at least one test launch from PSCA.

On November 19, 2021, Astra's LV0007 rocket achieved orbit from the Pacific Spaceport Complex.

Launch facilities 
The Kodiak spaceport has two launch pads with a mission control center that includes 64 workstations with high-speed communications and data links. There is a clean room for preparing satellites for launch, a fully enclosed 17-story-tall rocket assembly building and two independent range and telemetry systems. Launch pad 1 is designed for orbital launches, while launch pad 2 is intended for sub-orbital flights.

In 2010, Alaska Aerospace Corp. had a concept plan for a third launch pad to be built, which could allow the facility to support quick launches of satellites: under 24 hours to launch from "go ahead".

Launch history 
The first orbital launch from the PSCA was an Athena I rocket which carried out the Kodiak Star mission for NASA and the Space Test Program, launching Starshine 3, Sapphire, PCSat, and PICOSatS on 30 September 2001.

Additional sources: Center for Defense Information, Missile Defense Agency

The list above contains all launches, orbital and suborbital, up to January 2023.

References

External links 

Pacific Spaceport Complex – Alaska website by the Alaska Aerospace Corporation
Alaska Aerospace Development Corporation Annual Reports from 2002 to present hosted by the Alaska State Publications Program.
Economic impact of the Alaska Aerospace Development Corporation on the Kodiak Island Borough and the State of Alaska 2006 hosted by the Alaska State Publications Program.
Environmental monitoring report, FTG-02 launch : Kodiak Launch Complex, Kodiak, Alaska / prepared for Alaska Aerospace Development Corporation (2007) hosted by the Alaska State Publications Program.
Environmental monitoring report, FT-04-1 launch : Kodiak Launch Complex, Kodiak, Alaska (2006) hosted by the Alaska State Publications Program.

1998 establishments in Alaska
Buildings and structures in Kodiak Island Borough, Alaska
Rocket launch sites in the United States
Science and technology in Alaska
Spaceports in the United States